Chor Yuen, born Cheung Po-kin (8 October 1934 – 21 February 2022), was a Hong Kong film director, screenwriter, and actor. Chor is credited with over 120 films as director, over 70 films as a writer and over 40 films as an actor.

Early life and education 
Chor was born in Guangzhou, Guangdong, on 8 October 1934. He studied Chemistry at Sun Yat-sen University in Guangzhou, China.

Career 
In 1954, Chor started his acting career. Chor first appeared in Madam Yun, a 1954 historical drama film directed by Ng Wui. In 1956, Chor became a screenwriter. Chor first wrote Flower Petals in the Wind
(a.k.a. Petals in the Wind, A Flower Petal in the Wind), a 1956 drama film directed by Ng Wui. In 1957, Chor became a director with Kong Ngee Co., a Singapore film company that produced Cantonese films. Chor co-directed his first two films with Chun Kim. Chor co-directed Bloodshed in the Valley of Love, a 1957 Cantonese martial arts film. Chor also co-directed The Whispering Palm (a.k.a. Moon over Malaya), a 1957 Cantonese drama. In 1959, Chor directed Grass by the Lake (a.k.a. The Natural Son). Chor is credited with over 120 films as director, over 70 films as writer and over 40 films as actor.

Chor was also known for beautiful set designs of his martial arts films.

Personal life and death
Chor was married to Nam Hung, an actress. He died on 21 February 2022, at the age of 88.

Filmography

Films 
 1954 Madam Yun (aka Madam Wan, Six Chapters of a Floating Life) - Actor. Film debut.
 1957 Bloodshed in the Valley of Love (aka Blood Valley, Blood Stains the Valley of Love) - Co-director.
 1957 The Whispering Palm (aka Moon Over Malaya) - Co-director.
 1959 Orchid in the Storm (aka Twilight of Love) - Director.
 1960 Autumn Leaves (aka Autumn Leaf) - Director, writer.
 1960 The Great Devotion (aka Love Cannot Read) - Kwok-Hung. Also Director, screenwriter.
 1965 The Black Rose - Director.

 1966 Spy with My Face - Director. Sequel to The Black Rose.
 1967 Maiden Thief (aka The Wonder Thief, The Precious Mirror) - Director.
 1967 Man from Interpol - Director.
 1967 Revenger (Story of a Brave Soul) - Director.
 1967 To Rose with Love - Director.
 1970 Cold Blade - Director, screenwriter.
 1972 The Killer - Director.
 1972 Intimate Confessions of a Chinese Courtesan - Director.
 1973 The Bastard (aka Little Hero, The Little Illegitimate, Nobody's Son) - Director.
 1973 Haze In The Sunset - Director.
 1973 The House of 72 Tenants - Thief in the market. Also Director, screenwriter.
 1973 The Villains - Director.
 1974 Sex, Love and Hate - Director.
 1976 Killer Clans - Director.
 1976 The Magic Blade - Director.
 1976 The Web of Death - Director.
 1977 The Jade Tiger - Director.
 1977 Sentimental Swordsman - Director.
 1977 Clans of Intrigue - Director.
 1977 Death Duel - Director.
 1978 Swordsman and Enchantress - Director.
 1978 Legend of the Bat - Director.
 1978 Clan of Amazons - Director.
 1978 Heaven Sword and Dragon Sabre  - Director.
 1979 Full Moon Scimitar - Director.
 1979 The Proud Twins - Director.
 1980 Bat Without Wings - Director.
 1980 Heroes Shed No Tears - Director, screenwriter.
 1981 Return of the Sentimental Swordsman - Director, screenwriter.
 1986 Last Song in Paris - Director, screenwriter.

As director
Emperor and His Brother (1981)
The Duel of the Century (1981)
Perils of the Sentimental Swordsman (1982)
Mad, Mad 83 (1983)
The Hidden Power of the Dragon Sabre (1984)

As actor
Police Story (1985)
The Seventh Curse (1986)
Police Story 2 (1988)
Miracles (1989)
The Banquet (1991)
Twin Dragons (1992)
He Ain't Heavy, He's My Father (1993)
Thunderbolt (1995) - Uncle Tung / Foh's father
Those Were the Days (1997)

Television series
 Family Squad (1991)
A Kindred Spirit (1995)
 File of Justice IV (1995)
 Journey to the West (1996)
 File of Justice V (1997)
 Triumph Over Evil (1997)
 Journey to the West II (1998)
 Armed Reaction (1998)
 War of the Genders (2000)
 Armed Reaction II (2000)
 The Legendary Four Aces (2000)
 Armed Reaction III (2001)
 A Step into the Past (2001)
 Armed Reaction IV (2004)

Awards 
 2018 Lifetime Achievement Award. Presented at 37th Hong Kong Film Awards in Hong Kong. April 15, 2018.

References

External links
 Chor Yuen at filmaffinity.com

HK Cinemagic
 Chor Yuen at hkmdb.com
 Chor Yuen at letterboxd.com
 Chor Yuen at lovehkfilm.com
 Yuen Chor at rottentomatoes.com
 Chu Yuan at senscritique.com (in French)
 Chor Yuan at thespinningimage.co.uk

1934 births
2022 deaths
Hong Kong male film actors
Hong Kong male television actors
Hong Kong film directors
Hong Kong people of Hakka descent
Male actors from Guangzhou
Film directors from Guangdong
Male actors from Guangdong
People from Meixian District
Chinese film directors
Chinese male film actors
Chinese male television actors
20th-century Chinese male actors
21st-century Chinese male actors
20th-century Hong Kong male actors
21st-century Hong Kong male actors